B&B: Bella y Bestia (B&B: the Beauty and the Beast) is a 2008 Argentine sitcom, created by Cris Morena. It was released on January 7, 2008, on Canal 11. It is produced by Cris Morena Group and RGB.

The cast includes famous Argentine actors, such as Romina Yan, Damián de Santo, Maximiliano Ghione, Susana Ortiz and Graciela Pal.

Plot 
This is the story of music, love and hate between Bella and her three "meticulous" (and not so...) sons, and Benny his three "thoughtless" (and not so...) daughters. She is a ballerina, he is a rock musician.  Even though they don't like it, they end up directing a Music and Dance School together. Bella's sons are excellent orchestra musicians. Benny's daughters studied music with their father. They are more spontaneous musicians.  Together they have pop-rock band, where Benny takes the lead. Thus, joined by music, Benny and Bella, together with their children, will star one of the funniest stories ever. There are fights, alliances, dance, rock, classical music and a lot of fun.

Bella (Yan) is a neat woman, obsessive, well-educated, structured and always tries to follow the rules. She blames Benny for all her misfortunes... Generally, she is right about blaming him. He is the last man on the Earth she would like to fall in love with. Benny (de Santo), on the other hand, is complete opposite. He is vulgar, seizes the day, and laugh at everything. He hates responsibilities and does everything he can to avoid him. He can not stand Bella and does not like how organized she is, her controlled life and her meticulous routines.

They meet in an accident, where Benny ruins Bella's career forever. He twists her ankle right before the show that could make her famous forever, as a main ballerina. From that moment on, she hates him, and she swears to kill him if she ever sees him again. And she will try to, once she finds out that he is her new neighbour. But, it is said that destiny always know what to do. And this is how, in spite of their constant efforts to destroy each other, destiny gets its way and hate is superseded by a big love. A love is so strong that, even against themselves and their own craziness, against their children and all their obstacles, in the end, will join them forever within a framework of music, love and craziness.

In other countries

- M+M
The series has the same setting and plots, though the names of most of characters change, with Greek actors.

References

External links 
 Official Website
 B&B at Official Site of Cris Morena Group.
 B&B at IMDb.

Argentine telenovelas
2008 telenovelas
2008 Argentine television series debuts
2008 Argentine television series endings
Telefe telenovelas
Spanish-language telenovelas